Chelo Rural District is a rural district (dehestan) in Chelo District, Andika County, Khuzestan Province, Iran. At the 2006 census, its population was 5,118, in 833 families.  The rural district has 66 villages.

References 

Rural Districts of Khuzestan Province
Andika County